Presidential elections were held in Ecuador in 1905. The result was a victory for Lizardo García, who received 93% of the vote.

Results

References

Presidential elections in Ecuador
Ecuador
1905 in Ecuador
Election and referendum articles with incomplete results